Chaudhry Liaqat Abbas Bhatti is a Pakistani politician, who served as a member of the National Assembly of Pakistan.

Political career 
He was elected a member of National Assembly of Pakistan from Constituency NA-103 as a candidate of Pakistan Muslim League (Q) in 2002 Pakistani general election.

He was elected a member of National Assembly of Pakistan from NA-103 as a candidate of Pakistan Muslim League (Q) in 2008 Pakistani general election.

In 2012, he was made Federal Minister for Works by then Prime Minister Raja Pervaiz Ashraf.

He was re-elected to the National Assembly for the third time from NA-103 as a candidate of Pakistan Muslim League (Q) in 2013 Pakistani general election, however he was later disqualified and became ineligible to continue in office as constituency election was invalidated by voting irregularities.

References 

Pakistani MNAs 2013–2018
Living people
Punjabi people
People from Hafizabad District
Pakistani MNAs 2002–2007
Pakistani MNAs 2008–2013
Year of birth missing (living people)